The Miniș is a right tributary of the river Nera in Romania. It discharges into the Nera in Bozovici.

Tributaries

The following rivers are tributaries to the river Miniș (from source to mouth):

Left: Ponor, Steier, Predilcova, Mărasca, Ogașu Babei, Ogașu Mare, Poneasca, Zăgraza, Tăria
Right: Mândrișag, Călugăra, Păuleasca, Golumb, Bozovici, Lighidia

References

Rivers of Romania
Rivers of Caraș-Severin County